Corne Nel is a South African rugby league footballer who represented his country in the 2000 World Cup.

Playing career
Nel first played for South Africa in a 1997 match against France. He also played in the 1997 Super League World Nines tournament.

In 2000 he played in another international for South Africa, against Wales, and was then named in the countries squad for the 2000 World Cup. He played in two matches at the tournament.

References

Living people
South African rugby league players
South Africa national rugby league team players
Year of birth missing (living people)